Cosmo Maciocia (born February 2, 1942) is a Canadian politician.  He was a member of the National Assembly of Quebec and a city councillor in Montreal, Quebec.

Background
He was born in Cantalupo nel Sannio, Molise, Italy, on February 2, 1942, and arrived in Canada in 1964.

City councillor in Saint-Léonard
He was a city councillor in Saint-Léonard in 1978.

Member of the legislature
He successfully ran as a Liberal candidate to the provincial legislature for the district of Viger in 1981. He was re-elected in 1985, 1989, 1994 and 1998.

He was Parliamentary Assistant from 1985 to 1994.

Back in city politics
In the wake of the province-wide municipal merger of 2001, Maciocia gave up his seat and ran as a candidate of Gérald Tremblay's Montreal Island Citizens Union in the district of Marc-Aurèle-Fortin. The party is now known as Union Montréal.

In 2005, he was elected as borough mayor for Rivière-des-Prairies-Pointe-aux-Trembles-Montréal-Est, and retained his position as mayor of Rivière-des-Prairies–Pointe-aux-Trembles following the 2006 demerger of Montréal-Est.

Maciocia is a member of Montreal's executive committee.

He did not choose to run again in the 2009 Montreal municipal election, but his seat was retained for Union Montréal by Joe Magri.

Electoral record (incomplete)

Footnotes

1942 births
Living people
Italian emigrants to Canada
Montreal city councillors
Quebec Liberal Party MNAs
21st-century Canadian politicians